The Cyprus men's national under-18 basketball team is a national basketball team of Cyprus, administered by the Cyprus Basketball Federation. It represents the country in international men's under-18 basketball competitions.
 
The team won several medals at the FIBA U18 European Championship Division C.

FIBA U18 European Championship participations

See also
Cyprus men's national basketball team
Cyprus men's national under-16 basketball team
Cyprus women's national under-18 basketball team

References

External links
Archived records of Cyprus team participations

Basketball teams in Cyprus
Basketball
Men's national under-18 basketball teams